Overcomer may refer to:

 Overcomer (album), a 2013 album by Mandisa
 "Overcomer" (song), a 2013 song by Mandisa
 Overcomer (film), a 2019 American Christian drama film

See also
 Overcome (disambiguation)